is a railway station in Kashiba, Nara Prefecture, Japan.

Line
Kintetsu Railway
Osaka Line

Layout
The station has two side platforms on the ground, serving one track each.

Train schedules 
Suburban semi-Express and local meet 4/h stopped at noon.

Adjacent stations

External links
  Nijō Station page from K's Plaza

Railway stations in Nara Prefecture